Kleine Feldhofer Grotte was a karstic limestone cave and a paleoanthropologic site in the Neander Valley in western Germany. In August 1856, the Neanderthal type specimen was unearthed from the cave. Miners uncovered a skull cap and a number of skeletal bones to be labeled Neanderthal. The bones belong to at least three distinct individuals.

The cave got its name from the nearby large farm of the Feldhof.

The cave was destroyed during the 19th century as a result of industrial-scale limestone quarrying which widened the gorge. The location of the cave was soon forgotten and by 1900, unknown.

In 1997 a successful search for the site of the cave and its deposits yielded 24 fragments of human bone, one of which, identified as NN 13, fit exactly onto the left lateral femoral condyle of the Neanderthal 1 fossil. The 2000 excavation resulted in the recovery of  thousands of artifacts. The mitochondrial DNA of two bone samples were fully sequenced, and completed in 2009.

References

Archaeological sites in Germany
Mettmann (district)
Neanderthal sites